Alumni Hall may refer to:

Alumni Hall (DePaul University), on the DePaul University campus
Alumni Hall (Fairfield University), on the Fairfield University campus
Alumni Hall (Iowa State University), on the Iowa State University campus, listed on the NRHP in Iowa
Alumni Hall (Miami University), in Oxford, Ohio
Alumni Hall (Navy), on the US Naval Academy campus
Alumni Hall (Alfred, New York), listed on the NRHP in New York
Alumni Hall (University of Notre Dame), a residence hall at the University of Notre Dame
Alumni Hall (University of Pittsburgh), on the University of Pittsburgh campus
Alumni Hall (Providence), on the Providence College campus
Alumni Hall (Vanderbilt University), Nashville, Tennessee
Carnesecca Arena at St. John's University, New York City, formerly called Alumni Hall
 Alumni Hall (Ohio Dominican University), a basketball arena; see Ohio Dominican Panthers

See also
Alumni Gym (disambiguation)